Athletic Brewing Company is a leading U.S. manufacturer of non-alcoholic craft beer based in Stratford, Connecticut.  The company was founded in 2017 by  Bill Shufelt and John Walker.

History
Bill Shufelt was trader at a hedge fund and an ultramarathon runner who stopped drinking alcohol in 2013. However, he found non-alcoholic drinks to be unsatisfactory, and sought out John Walker, a head brewer in Santa Fe to produce better tasting non-alcohol beers. They started their craft beer business Athletic Brewing in 2017, and established the first brewing facility dedicated to non-alcoholic beer in Stratford, Connecticut, which opened in May 2018. 

Athletic Brewing was launched with two beers, and initially began selling in seven stores in New England on a trial basis, which then expanded to all the states in the US, and then other countries around the world. Athletic's sales grew from $2.5 million in 2019 to about $15 million in 2020, increasing by about 500% and achieved a 61% market share of the non-alcoholic craft beer market in the U.S. It achieved sales of nearly $37 million from over 100,000 barrels of beer in 2021 (up from 37,500 in 2020). It was ranked the second-fastest growing food and beverage company (and 26th overall) in the U.S. in 2022 by Inc., as well as one of the 100 most influential companies of 2022 by Time magazine.

In 2020, Athletic added a second manufacturing location when it purchased a brewing facility in San Diego, California from Ballast Point Brewing Company. In 2022, it opened a 150,000 square foot brewing facility in Milford, Connecticut, that is capable of producing 6 million cases annually.

Keurig Dr Pepper took a $50 million minority stake in Athletic Brewing in 2022.

Athletic's investors include a number of athletes and celebrities, including pro football players J. J. Watt and Justin Tuck, Momofuku founder David Chang, cyclist Lance Armstrong, and Toms Shoes founder Blake Mycoskie.

Awards
In 2020, Athletic's Free Wave IPA won the award as Supreme Champion Beer at the International Beer Challenge, the first non-alcoholic beer to win the award, beating over 500 other entries.  The beer also took the title for Best No & Low Alcohol Beer, and Athletic itself was declared Brewer of the Year for North America. Its beers have won at the World Beer Awards, US Open Beer Championship, Great American Beer Festival, and Best of Craft Beer Awards. Its Run Wild IPA was named the Best Non-Alcoholic Beer in the inaugural Tasting Alliance World Beer Competition.

References

Beer brewing companies based in Connecticut
Food and drink companies established in 2017
Companies based in Stratford, Connecticut